The 100th Illinois General Assembly, consisting of the Illinois House and Illinois Senate, convened on January 11, 2017. It adjourned sine die on January 9, 2019.

Legislation 

The 100th General Assembly enacted a total of 1,190 bills into law. Notably among these, it passed the first state budget in more than two years, ending the Illinois Budget Impasse that began under the 99th Illinois General Assembly.  The budget was passed over the veto of Governor Bruce Rauner.

Other laws passed over the governor's veto included a measure allowing municipalities to designate urban agriculture zones to provide tax abatements to urban farming operations. The override passed the State Senate by 49 to 1.

Other notable legislation included a measure that amended the Illinois Abortion Law of 1975, removing a trigger law that would have outlawed abortion in the state if the United States Supreme Court overturned the Roe v. Wade decision that affirmed a constitutional right to abortion. The bill was signed by Governor Rauner, who was in favor of abortion rights. Although amended, the Illinois Abortion Law nonetheless remained on the books until the passage of the Illinois Reproductive Health Act by the 101st Illinois General Assembly in 2019.

The General Assembly also amended the Illinois Endangered Species Protection Act to ban the use of elephants in traveling circuses. Illinois was the first state that banned such performances.  

The General Assembly also enacted multiple gun control measures, including one that imposed a 72-hour waiting period for all firearm purchases.

In January 2018, Illinois became the first state in the US to adopt legislation recognizing postpartum depression and postpartum psychosis as mitigating factors in forcible felonies. The legislation applies to criminal sentencing as well as post-conviction relief. It was signed into law by governor Bruce Rauner just before the end of the session, on January 8, 2018.

Senate 

Of the Senate's 59 members, 40 stood for election in the 2016 Illinois Senate election. Two districts, the 47th and 59th, changed hands from the Democratic to the Republican Party.

Senate leadership

Party composition 

The Senate of the 100th General Assembly consisted of 22 Republicans and 37 Democrats.

State Senators

House

Party composition

The House of the 100th General Assembly consisted of 51 Republicans and 67 Democrats. The composition reflects the results of the 2016 election.

House leadership

State Representatives

References 

2017 in Illinois
2018 in Illinois
Illinois legislative sessions
2017 U.S. legislative sessions
2018 U.S. legislative sessions